The ambassador of Japan to the United States has existed since 1860, interrupted by disagreements and wars during World War II.

Koji Tomita is the current Japanese ambassador to the United States, having presented his credentials on March 28, 2018.

Special Charge d'Affaires 
 Arinori Mori, 1870–1872
 Saburō Takagi, 1872–1873
 Jirō Yano, 1873–1874

Envoy Extraordinary and Minister Plenipotentiary 
 Kiyonari Yoshida, 1874–1882
 Munenori Terashima, 1882–1884
 Ryūichi Kuki, 1884–1888
 Viscount Munemitsu Mutsu, 1888–1890
 Gōzō Tateno, 1891–1894
 Shin'ichirō Kurino, 1894–1896
 Tōru Hoshi, 1896–1898
 Jutarō Komura, 1898–1900
 Baron Kogorō Takahira, 1900–1906 (1st time)

Ambassador 
 Viscount Shūzō Aoki, 1906–1908
 Baron Kogorō Takahira, 1908–1909 (2nd time)
 Viscount Kōsai Uchida, 1909–1911
 Viscount Sutemi Chinda, 1912–1916
 Aimaro Satō, 1916–1918
 Viscount Kikujirō Ishii, 1918–1919
 Baron Kijūrō Shidehara, 1919–1922
 Masanao Hanihara, 1922–1924
 Tsuneo Matsudaira, 1924–1928
 Katsuji Debuchi, 1928–1934
 Hiroshi Saitō, 1934–1939
 Kensuke Horinouchi, 1939–1940
 Kichisaburō Nomura, 1941–1944 (Ambassador during the attack on Pearl Harbor)
 Saburō Kurusu, 1941–1945 (Special envoy to negotiate peace with U.S. officials)
 No representation during Allied occupation of Japan (1945–1952)
 Eikichi Araki, 1952–1953
 Sadao Iguchi, 1954–1956
 Masayuki Tani, 1956–1957
 Kōichirō Asakai, 1957–1963
 Ryūji Takeuchi, 1963–1967
 Takeso Shimoda, 1967–1970
 Nobuhiko Ushiba, 1970–1973
 Takeshi Yasukawa, 1973–1976
 Fumihiko Tōgō, 1976–1980
 Yoshio Ōkawara, 1980–1985
 Nobuo Matsunaga, 1985–1989
 Ryōhei Murata, 1989–1992
 Takakazu Kuriyama, 1992–1995
 Kunihiko Saitō, 1995–1999
 Shunji Yanai, 1999–2001
 Ryōzō Katō, 2001–2008
 Ichirō Fujisaki, 2008–2012
 Ken'ichirō Sasae, 2012–2018
 Shinsuke J. Sugiyama, 2018-2021
 Koji Tomita, 2021-present

See also 
 Japanese Embassy to the United States (up until 1860)
 Embassy of Japan in Washington, D.C.
 United States Ambassador to Japan
 Japan–United States relations
 Convention of Kanagawa
 Treaty of Amity and Commerce (United States–Japan)
 Security Treaty Between the United States and Japan
 Treaty of San Francisco
 Treaty of Mutual Cooperation and Security between the United States and Japan
 United States Forces Japan
 U.S.–Japan Status of Forces Agreement
 Foreign relations of Japan
 Foreign relations of the United States
 Ambassadors of the United States
 Embassy of the United States in Tokyo

References 

 
1860 establishments in Japan
United States of America
Japan